On Location Vacations (OLV) is an American media company and blog that covers TV and movie filming locations and filming news. Based in New York, OLV is notable as one of the largest film location websites in the United States, providing travel information based on where major American television shows and films are currently being produced. On Location Vacations has been also featured in major national media outlets such as Newsweek, Business Week, Entertainment Weekly, The Wall Street Journal, and The Today Show. In 2021, contributors moved to Twitter and other social media to post content, and closed down the website.

Background
On Location Vacations (OLV) was founded by Christine Bord in 2006 while she was a graduate student studying design. Bord founded OLV as a blog that covers TV and movie filming locations, filming news, and behind-the-scene tours.

On Location Vacations focuses on notable historic movie sets located in Los Angeles, New York City, and other regions, as well as the best locations for celebrity sightings.

Selected publications

Selected awards
 2015 - 7th Shorty Awards: Finalist in Blogger

See also
Location shooting
Filming location

References

Mass media companies of the United States
American blogs
Film location shooting
Tourism in New York (state)
Tourism in New York City
Tourism in Los Angeles
Film organizations in the United States